Aangal is a small village located in Ugrachandi Nala VDC of Kavrepalanchok District of Nepal, with approximately 300–400 inhabitants. Brahmin, Chhetri and Newar castes live in the village.

Guptabalmikeshwor Mahadev temple lies in this place which is famous in the whole VDC.

Kavrepalanchok District